Islam is the largest religion in Nigeria and the country has the largest Muslim population in Africa. In 2018, the CIA World Factbook estimated that 53.5% of Nigeria's population is Muslim.  Islam is predominantly concentrated in the northern half of the country, with a significant Muslim minority in the southern region. Islam was introduced to what is now Nigeria during the 11th century via trade routes with North Africa and the Senegalese basin, and it was the first monotheistic Abrahamic religion to arrive in Nigeria. Christianity was later introduced in the 15th century by Portuguese missionaries, and grew to be a dominant religion alongside Islam.
Muslims in Nigeria are predominantly Sunnis of the Maliki school of thought. However, there is a significant Shia minority, primarily in Kaduna, Kano, Katsina, Osun, Kwara,  Yobe and Sokoto states (see Shia in Nigeria). In particular, A 2008 Pew Forum survey on religious diversity identified 5% of Nigerian Muslims as Shia. The Ahmadiyya movement also has a sizeable presence in the country.

History

Islam in Northern Nigeria
Islam was introduced to Nigeria during the 11th century through two geographical routes: North Africa and the Senegalese Basin. The origins of Islam in the country is linked with the development of Islam in the wider West Africa. Trade was the major connecting link that brought Islam into Nigeria. Islam was first documented in Central Sudan by medieval Islamic historians and geographers such as Al-Bakri, Yaqut al-Hamawi and Al-Maqrizi and later works of Ibn Battuta and Ibn Khaldun offered more notes about Islam in West Africa.

Islam grew in North-East Nigeria, in particular, the Kanem empire as a result of trade between Kanem and Northern African regions of Fezzan, Egypt and Cyrenaica in the eleventh century. Muslim merchants from the North sometimes remained in settlements along trade routes, this merchant class would later preach the message of Islam to their host communities. The first documented conversion of a traditional ruler was in the eleventh century when Mai Ume Jilmi of Kanem was converted by a Muslim scholar whose descendants later held a hereditary title of Chief Imam of Kanem.

Writings by Ahmad Fartua an Imam during the period of Idris Alooma provided glimpse of an active Islamic community in Bornu while religious archives showed Islam had been adopted as the religion of the majority of the leading figures in the Borno Empire during the reign of Mai (king) Idris Alooma (1571–1603), although a large part of that country still adhered to traditional religions. Alooma furthered the cause of Islam in the country by introducing Islamic courts, establishing mosques, and setting up a hostel in Makkah, the Islamic pilgrimage destination, for Kanuris.

In Hausaland, particularly Kano, Islam is noted to have penetrated the territory in the fourteenth century from West African traders who were the Mande people Muslims from the Senegalese basin and Muslim traders from Mali Empire. Muhammed Rumfa (1463 - 1499) was the first ruler to convert to Islam in Hausaland. It had spread to the major cities of the northern part of the country by the 16th century, later moving into the countryside and towards the Middle Belt uplands. However, there are some claims for an earlier arrival. The Nigeria-born Muslim scholar Sheikh Dr. Abu-Abdullah Abdul-Fattah Adelabu has argued that Islam had reached Sub-Sahara Africa, including Nigeria, as early as the 1st century of Hijrah through Muslim traders and expeditions during the reign of the Arab conqueror, Uqba ibn al Nafia (622–683), whose Islamic conquests under the Umayyad dynasty, during Muawiyah's and Yazid's time, spread all Northern Africa or the Maghrib Al-Arabi, which includes present-day Algeria, Tunisia, Libya and Morocco.

Fulani War

In the early 19th century, Islamic scholar Usman dan Fodio launched a jihad, which is called the Fulani War, against the Hausa Kingdoms of Northern Nigeria. He was victorious, and established the Fulani Empire with its capital at Sokoto.

Sokoto Caliphate

In 1803, Usman dan Fodio founded the Sokoto Caliphate. Usman dan Fodio was elected "Commander of the Faithful" by his followers. The Sokoto Caliphate became one of the largest empires in Africa, stretching from modern-day Burkina Faso to Cameroon and including most of northern Nigeria and southern Niger. At its height, the Sokoto state included over 30 different emirates under its political structure. In its hold, the caliphate ruled through much of the 19th century, until 29 July 1903, the second battle of Burmi concluded its dissolution by British and German forces.

Islam in Southwestern Nigeria 
Islam also came to the southwestern Yoruba-speaking areas during the time of the Mali Empire. In his Movements of Islam in face of the Empires and Kingdoms in Yorubaland, Sheikh Dr. Abu-Abdullah Adelabu supported his claims on early arrival of Islam in the southwestern Nigeria by citing the Arab anthropologist Abduhu Badawi, who argued that the fall of Koush southern Egypt and the prosperity of the politically multicultural Abbasid period in the continent had created several streams of migration, moving west in the mid-9th Sub-Sahara.  According to Adelabu, the popularity and influences of the Abbasid Dynasty, the second great dynasty with the rulers carrying the title of 'Caliph' fostered peaceful and prosperous search of pastures by the inter-cultured Muslims from Nile to Niger and Arab traders from Desert to Benue, echoing the conventional historical view that the conquest of North Africa by the Islamic Umayyad Caliphate between AD 647–709 effectively ended Catholicism in Africa for several centuries. Islam in Ancient Yoruba is referred to as Esin Imale, which folk etymology states it comes from the word "Mali." The earliest introduction of the religion to that region was through Malian itinerant traders (Wangara Traders) around the 14th century. Large-scale conversion to Islam happened in the 18th-19th centuries.

Yorubas came in contact with Islam around the 14th century during the reign of Mansa Kankan Musa of the Mali Empire. According to Al-Aluri, the first Mosque was built in Ọyọ-Ile in AD 1550 although, there were no Yoruba Muslims, the Mosque only served the spiritual needs of foreign Muslims living in Ọyọ. Progressively, Islam came to Yoruba land, and Muslims started building Mosques: Iwo town led, its first Mosque built in 1655 followed by Iṣẹyin, in 1760; Lagos, 1774; Ṣaki, 1790; and Oṣogbo, 1889. In time, Islam spread to other towns like Oyo (the first Oyo convert was Solagberu), Ibadan, Abẹokuta, Ijẹbu-Ode, Ikirun, and Ẹdẹ before the 19th-century Sokoto jihad. Several factors contributed to the rise of Islam in Yoruba land by mid 19th century. Before the decline of Ọyọ, several towns around it had large Muslim communities, unfortunately, when Ọyọ was destroyed, these Muslims (Yoruba and immigrants) relocated to newly formed towns and villages and became Islam protagonists. Second, there was a mass movement of people at this time into Yoruba land, many of these immigrants were Muslims who introduced Islam to their host. According to Eades, the religion "differed in attraction" and "better adapted to Yoruba social structure, because it permitted polygamy"; more influential Yorubas like (Seriki Kuku of Ijebu land) soon became Muslims with positive impact on the natives. Islam came to Lagos at about the same time like other Yoruba towns, however, it received royal support from Ọba Kosọkọ, after he came back from exile in Ẹpẹ. According to Gbadamọṣi (1972; 1978 in Eades, 1980) Islam soon spread to other Yoruba towns, especially, during the intra-tribal wars-when there was a high demand for Islamic teachers-who dubbed as both Quran teachers and amulet makers for Yoruba soldiers during the intra-tribal wars in Yoruba land. Islam, like Christianity also found a common ground with the natives that believed in Supreme Being, while there were some areas of disagreements, Islamic teachers impressed upon their audience the need to change from worshipping idols and embrace Allah. Without delay, Islamic scholars and local Imams started establishing Quranic centers to teach Arabic and Islamic studies, much later, conventional schools were established to educate new converts and to propagate Islam. Traditional shrines and ritual sites were replaced with Central Mosques in major Yoruba town and cities.

Maitatsine

A fringe and heretical group, led by the cleric Mohammed Marwa Maitatsine, started in Kano in the late 1970s and operated throughout the 1980s. Maitatsine (since deceased) was from Cameroon, and claimed to have had divine revelations superseding those of the Islamic prophet Muhammad. With their own mosques and a doctrine antagonistic to established Islamic and societal leadership, its main appeal was to marginal and poverty-stricken urban in-migrants, whose rejection by the more established urban groups fostered this religious opposition. These disaffected adherents ultimately lashed out at the more traditional mosques and congregations, resulting in violent outbreaks in several cities of the north.

Quranists

Non-sectarian Muslims who reject the authority of hadith, known as Quranists, Quraniyoon, or 'Yan Kala Kato, are also present in Nigeria. 'Yan Kala Kato is often mistaken for a militant group called Yan Tatsine (also known as Maitatsine), an unrelated group founded by Muhammadu Marwa. Marwa was killed in 1980. Marwa's successor, Musa Makaniki, was arrested in 2004 and sentenced in 2006, but later released. And another leader of Yan Tatsine, Malam Badamasi, was killed in 2009. Notable Nigerian Quranists include Islamic scholars Mallam Saleh Idris Bello,

Islam in Nigerian society

As an institution in Northern Nigeria, Islam plays an important role in society. The five pillars of Islam including the annual pilgrimage and daily prayers are seen as important duties of Muslims. Support for the inclusion of a sharia legal system that governs family law and a religious view about modes of personal conduct have support within the society.

According to Pew Research Center in 2010, Muslims in Nigeria overwhelmingly favoured Islam playing a large role in politics. A majority of Muslims in Nigeria favoured stoning and/or whipping adulterers, cutting off hands for crimes like theft or robbery, and the death penalty for those who abandon Islam.

Sheikh Adelabu has mentioned other aspects of culture influenced by Islam in Nigeria. He cited Arabic words used in Nigerian languages, especially Yoruba and Hausa names of the days such as Atalata (Ar. Ath-Thulatha الثلاثاء) for Tuesday, Alaruba (Ar. Al-Arbi'a الأربعاء) for Wednesday, Alamisi (Ar. Al-Khamis الخميس) for Thursday, and Jimoh (Ar. Al-Jum'ah الجمعة) for Friday.  By far Ojo Jimoh is the most favourably used.  I usually preferred to the unpleasant Yoruba word for Friday Eti, which means Failure, Laziness or Abandonment. Maintaining that the wide adoption of Islamic faith and traditions has succeeded to lay impacts both on written and spoken Nigerian vernaculars, Sheikh Adelabu asserted nearly all technical terms and cultural usages of Hausa and Fulani were derived from Islamic heritages, citing a long list of Hausa words adopted from Arabic.  In furthering supports for his claims, Sheikh Adelabu gave the following words to be Yoruba's derivatives of Arabic vocabularies:
Alaafia i.e. Good, Fine Or Healthy from derivative Al-Aafiah (Ar. العافية)
Baale i.e. husband or spouse derived from Ba'al (Ar. بعل)
Sanma i.e. heaven or sky adopted for Samaa` (Ar. السماء)
Alubarika i.e. blessing used as Al-Barakah (Ar. البركة)
Wakati i.e. hour or time formed from Waqt (Ar. وقت)
Asiri i.e. Secrete or Hidden derivative of As-Sirr (Ar. السرّ)

Sharia law 

In 2008, twelve states located in northern Nigeria had fully implemented Sharia law. The twelve states in northern Nigeria have populations where Muslims form the majority.

In 2014, homosexual men were targeted by Hisbah, the religious police. According to a member of the Sharia Commission, homosexuals should be killed by stoning, hanging or pushing them from a high place. In Nigeria, federal law criminalizes homosexual behaviour, but states with Sharia law imposed the death penalty.

Influence on culture 
Historically, Islam fostered trade relations between North Africa and West Africa. Arabic traders from Tiaret during the Rustamid dynasty were involved in commerce with Audoghast. These trade routes went further south into the Kanuri and Hausa states of Northern Nigeria. Sharia was also introduced into Northern Nigeria as Islam spread across the region. In addition to law and trade, Islam had some influence in spreading the choice of dressing, language and choice of names.

Agbada dressing in West Africa is commonly associated with Muslims and Mallams, Iborun (neck covers) is worn by many Muslims in Southern Nigeria during prayers and crochet hats were once mostly worn by Muslims to had performed the pilgrimage. Some Hausa and Yoruba expressions and words are also influenced by Arabic, the language of the Koran. Assalam Alaykun is a familiar expression for greeting by Muslims and Allahu Akbar is used as a call to prayer. Names such as Mohammed, Ibrahim, Yunusa, Lamidi, Aliu and Suleiman are commonly given to Muslim children.

Traditional Islamic education 

Before the 1950s, the most common educational path of Muslim children in Northern Nigeria was Quranic education taught by Mallams. Students converge in the compound of a mallam or at a Quranic boarding school where they recite the Quran and learn Islamic teachings. The teacher or Mallam as they are sometimes called in Nigeria was likely a graduate of a similar school and likely belongs to a Sufi order. These teachers were well versed in Arabic and were influenced by the knowledge and traditions passed down from medieval Timbuktu and from other West African Islamic texts.  Traditional Islamic teaching was considered a duty to God and teachers sometimes depended on charity or patrons to make ends meet. Meanwhile,  students also assist teachers in raising funds through door-to-door solicitations. In the period preceding Nigeria's independence, political leaders desired Western-trained graduates to fill positions in government. Subsequently, the introduction of a formal School of Arabic Studies in Kano to train Qadis and rise in Western education reduced the number of children attending the Quranic schools. In addition, Islamic studies were introduced into the primary and secondary school curriculum.  However, some parents still send their children to the traditional Quranic schools under the tutelage of a mallam. The students are provided shelter by their teacher. The pre-adolescents sometimes subsist through alms begging or house-help jobs, while those above fifteen learn a trade or do petty trading along with their Islamic studies. The studies can be rigorous, with students studying the Quran for fourteen hours per day until they reach a set level of maturity. These students, primarily from rural areas, are called Almajiri—a transliteration of Al Muhajirun, the Arabic word for emigrant—in Nigeria. This act is frowned upon by Western-educated Muslims who are uncomfortable with the alms begging lifestyle of many Almajiri since it is not part of Islamic teachings.

Extremism 
In Nigeria, Pew Research polled the views of Muslims on extremist groups. 45% favoured Hezbollah, 49% favoured Hamas and 49% favoured Al-Qaeda. Unlike other Muslim countries, Nigeria was the only country where Muslims were positive towards Al-Qaeda.

Boko Haram 

Boko Haram is a terrorist organisation that aims to create an Islamic state in Nigeria, West Africa. Its first attack was directed towards the Bauchi prison in 2009.

 On the night of 14–15 April 2014, 276 female students were kidnapped from the Government Secondary School in the town of Chibok in Borno State, Nigeria. Responsibility for the kidnappings was claimed by Boko Haram, an extremist terrorist organization based in northeastern Nigeria. 57 of the schoolgirls managed to escape over the next few months
On the night of 5–6 May 2014, Boko Haram militants attacked the twin towns of Gamboru and Ngala in Borno State, Nigeria. Roughly 310 residents were killed in the 12-hour attack, and the town was largely destroyed.

Organisation of Nigerian Islam

Sa'adu Abubakar, the 20th Sultan of Sokoto, is considered the spiritual leader of Nigeria's Muslims.

Several Muslim organisations, lobbies and pressure groups exist such as Nasfat, MPAC Nigeria  and the Muslim Rights Concern.

See also

Islam by country
Religion in Nigeria
Christianity in Nigeria
New radical Islamic movements in Nigeria
Islam in Bangladesh
Islam in China
Islam in Indonesia
Islam in Iran
Islam in Pakistan
Islam in the Philippines
Islam in Russia

References

Sources

External links
 Islam in Nigeria: Simmering tensions
 BBC Facts & Figures

 
Nigeria